Guatemala will participate in the 2011 Parapan American Games.

Athletics

Guatemala will send three male athletes to compete.

Judo

Guatemala will send one male athlete to compete.

Powerlifting

Guatemala will send one male athlete to compete.

Wheelchair basketball

Guatemala will send a team of twelve male athletes and a team of ten female athletes to compete in the men's and women's tournaments.

Wheelchair tennis

Guatemala will send one male athlete to compete.

Nations at the 2011 Parapan American Games
2011 in Guatemalan sport
Guatemala at the Pan American Games